This is a list of people who have served as Custos Rotulorum of Oxfordshire.

 William Fermor bef. 1544–1552
 John Williams, 1st Baron Williams of Thame bef. 1558–1559
 Sir Francis Knollys bef. 1562 – aft. 1584
 William Knollys, 1st Earl of Banbury bef. 1594–1632
 Thomas Howard, 1st Earl of Berkshire 1632–1646
 Interregnum
 Thomas Howard, 1st Earl of Berkshire 1660
 Henry Cary, 4th Viscount Falkland 1660–1663
 Henry Hyde, 2nd Earl of Clarendon 1663–1689
 James Bertie, 1st Earl of Abingdon 1689–1697

For later custodes rotulorum, see Lord Lieutenant of Oxfordshire.

References

Institute of Historical Research - Custodes Rotulorum 1544-1646
Institute of Historical Research - Custodes Rotulorum 1660-1828

Local government in Oxfordshire
Custos Rotulorum
Oxfordshire